Sheesh Mahal (Hindi/Urdu: Palace of Mirrors) may refer to:

Architecture
 Sheesh Mahal, Amer Fort, in Amer, Rajasthan, India
 Sheesh Mahal (Lahore Fort), in Lahore, Punjab Pakistan
 Sheesh Mahal, at Patiala, Punjab, India
 Sheesh Mahal, in the Orchha Fort complex, Orchha, Madhya Pradesh, India
 Sheesh Mahal in Agra Fort, Agra, Uttar Pradesh, India

Other uses
 Sheesh Mahal (1950 film)

See also 
 Shish (disambiguation)